The men's 100 metres event at the 2016 Summer Olympics took place between 13–14 August at the Olympic Stadium. 84 athletes from 57 nations competed.

Background
Billed as one of the most anticipated races in history, Usain Bolt of Jamaica entered as the world record holder, defending Olympic champion and the reigning world champion. He sought to become the first man to win three Olympic 100 m titles, en route to the "Triple-Triple"; 100m, 200m and 4 × 100 metres relay gold medals at three consecutive Olympic Games. However, with recurring injury problems affecting his early season, he was ranked 4th in the year with 9.88 seconds, and only raced three 100 m finals before pulling out of the Jamaican Trials; he only qualified for the Olympics through a medical exemption. Meanwhile, his biggest rival was Justin Gatlin of the United States, the world leader for three consecutive years who had threatened Bolt's world titles in 2013 and more prominently in 2015. Despite also having injuries in the early season, the 34-year old Gatlin also went unbeaten in the season, going on to win the American Trials in a world-leading 9.80 seconds.

Trayvon Bromell, joint-bronze medalist at the 2015 World Championship and the world junior record holder, finished second to Gatlin at the American Trials with the second-fastest time of the year. Defending silver medallist and joint-second fastest man in history Yohan Blake, who won the Jamaican Trials in Bolt's absence, showed a strong return to form since his near career-ending injuries from 2013–2015. Nickel Ashmeade and Marvin Bracy filled out the  Jamaican and American rosters. Meanwhile, France's Jimmy Vicaut, co-European record holder, equaled the 9.86 record once again, and Akani Simbine was the last man under 9.9 seconds that year, with a South African record of 9.89. Other contenders included the other bronze medalist in the 2015 World Championship Andre De Grasse, 5th ranked Femi Ogunode who equaled his Asian record of 9.91, and the British trio of James Dasaolu, James Ellington, and Chijindu Ujah.

Macedonia and Palestine competed for the first time in the event. The United States made its 27th appearance in the event, the most of any country, having missed only the boycotted 1980 Games.

Summary
In the preliminary round, Hassan Saaid of the Maldives and Rodman Teltull of Palau were the fastest to progress, both managing under 10.6 seconds. Siueni Filimone qualified but pulled a hamstring at the finish and was unable to compete in the next round. 

Gatlin was the fastest in the heats at 10.01, with Bolt not too far behind at 10.07. Kemarley Brown, Zhenye Xie and Ben Youssef Meite were surprise heat winners, while Vicaut and Bracy amazingly only qualified on time. The most prominent casualties were Ogunode, Ellington, European champion Churandy Martina, sub-10 Canadian Aaron Brown, 2008 silver medalist Richard Thompson, and his teammate Keston Bledman.

Vicaut made up for his sluggish heat by winning the first semifinal in 9.95. In the second semifinal, Bolt silenced doubters by casually jogging 9.86 to win; Bolt had done the same in 9.87 and 9.85 at the previous two Olympic games, proving that he was in excellent shape. Andre De Grasse finished second in 9.92, equaling his personal best and boosting his status as a medal contender by tenfold. De Grasse also appeared to be mimicking Bolt, glancing at the field every time Bolt did. Gatlin won the last semifinal in an easy 9.94, then immediately left the arena to begin preparing for the final. 

In the final, Gatlin's introduction prompted negative reception from the crowd, while Bolt's introduction filled the stadium with cheers once again. At the gun, Gatlin got the best start, slightly ahead of Simbine and Bromell to his inside. Two lanes outside, Bolt was behind and stayed level with De Grasse and Meite. By the middle of the race, Gatlin had 2 metres on Bolt and it seemed as though the Jamaican would be defeated. However, Bolt quickly hit top speed and surged ahead, catching the American at 75 meters and pulling away at 80. Usain thumped his chest as he crossed the line in first, making history as the first man in history to win 3 consecutive Olympic golds in the 100m. Gatlin was forced to settle for the silver and was nearly caught by De Grasse, who pipped Blake and Simbine for the Bronze medal. 

Usain Bolt's win broke 2 records; becoming the first person to win the 100 meter race 3 times and also to medal 3 times in the 100 meter race. Previously, only Carl Lewis had won two gold medals in the 100m, a feat which Bolt had matched at the London 2012 Summer Olympics. However, finishing several hundredths of a second later, Gatlin, also having a place on the podium, joined him in winning three 100m medals; one gold, one silver (for this race), and one bronze, which itself made Gatlin the first man in history to win each medal in the 100 meters. Gatlin also became the holder of the record for the longest time between their first medal and last medal in the 100m,  in terms of years. His first being his gold won at the 2004 Summer Olympics and his silver medal, 12 years later in this race.

Bolt's winning time of 9.81 seconds was his slowest at the Olympics, but a season's best and the second fastest of the year behind Gatlin. De Grasse' 9.91 was a new personal best, and Meite set a new national record of 9.96 for 6th. The final was significantly slower than London and slightly slower than Beijing, but was still one of the fastest in Olympic history. The race was strikingly similar to Beijing in 2008; the 2nd to 6th athletes finished very closely, with 2nd, 3rd and 4th being won in 9.89, 9.91 and 9.93 respectively, while 7th and 8th finished further behind the field and had a difference of 0.02 between them.

The following evening the medals were presented by Valeriy Borzov, IOC member, Ukraine, and Sebastian Coe, President of the IAAF.

Qualification

A National Olympic Committee (NOC) could enter up to 3 qualified athletes in the men's 100 metres event if all athletes meet the entry standard during the qualifying period. (The limit of 3 has been in place since the 1930 Olympic Congress.) The qualifying standard was 10.16 seconds. The qualifying period was from 1 May 2015 to 11 July 2016. The qualifying time standards could be obtained in various meets during the given period that have the approval of the IAAF. Only outdoor meets were eligible for the sprints and short hurdles, including the 100 metres. NOCs could also use their universality place—each NOC could enter one male athlete regardless of time if they had no male athletes meeting the entry standard for an athletics event—in the 100 metres.

Competition format

The event continued to use the preliminaries plus three main rounds format introduced in 2012. Athletes not meeting the qualification standard competed in the preliminaries; those who met the standard started in the first round.

The preliminary round consisted of 3 heats, each with 7 or 8 athletes. The top two runners in each heat advanced, along with the next two fastest runners overall. They joined the faster entrants in the first round of heats, which consisted of 8 heats of 8 or 9 athletes each. The top two runners in each heat, along with the next eight fastest runners overall, moved on to the semifinals. The 24 semifinalists competed in three heats of 8, with the top two in each semifinal and the next two overall advancing to the eight-man final.

Records

Prior to this competition, the existing world and Olympic records were as follows.

The following national records were established during the competition:

Schedule
All times are Brasilia Time (UTC-3)

Results

Preliminaries
The preliminary round featured athletes invited to compete who had not achieved the required qualifying standard. Athletes who had achieved the standard received a bye into the first round proper.
Qualification rules: First 2 in each heat (Q) and the next 2 fastest (q) advance to Round 1.

Preliminary heat 1

Preliminary heat 2

Preliminary heat 3

Heats
Qualification rules: First 2 in each heat (Q) and the next 8 fastest (q) advance to the Semifinals.

Heat 1

Heat 2

Heat 3

Heat 4

Heat 5

Heat 6

Heat 7

Heat 8

Semifinals

Semifinal 1

Semifinal 2

Semifinal 3

Final

References

External links

Men's 100 metres
2016
Men's events at the 2016 Summer Olympics